Guillermo Alejandro Hernández Sánchez (born June 25, 1942, in Zacoalco de Torres) is a Mexican former football defender, who played for the Mexico national team between 1966 and 1973, gaining 55 caps and scoring 2 goals. He was part of the Mexico squad for the 1966 and 1970 World Cups.

External links
 
 

1942 births
Living people
Association football defenders
Mexico international footballers
Footballers from Jalisco
1966 FIFA World Cup players
1970 FIFA World Cup players
Club Puebla players
Atlas F.C. footballers
Club América footballers
Olympic footballers of Mexico
Footballers at the 1964 Summer Olympics
Liga MX players
Mexican footballers